Kondapur is a Mandal in former Medak district of Telangana, India.

Kondapur is a Village and Mandal in a newly formed Sangareddy district of Telangana State, India. Kondapur belongs to Sangareddy revenue division.

There is a museum (belonging to Archaeological Survey of India department) located about 1 km south of the village, Kondapur. The museum houses exhibits from an ancient mound locally known as Kotagadda (Fort Mound) which is located nearby. The remains of a highly artistic life led by the people of the early historic period are found at this museum.

Geography 
It has an average elevation of 525 meters (1725 feet).

Kondapur Mandal is bounded by Sangareddy Mandal towards North and Sadasivpet Mandal towards west.

References 

Mandals in Medak district